Seara is a municipality in the state of Santa Catarina in the South region of Brazil. The Museu Entomológico Fritz Plaumann is located in the town.

See also
List of municipalities in Santa Catarina

References

Municipalities in Santa Catarina (state)